Niall Scully (born 19 April 1994) is a Gaelic footballer who plays for the Templeogue Synge Street club and for the Dublin county team.

References

1994 births
Living people
Dublin inter-county Gaelic footballers
Gaelic football forwards
Sportspeople from Dublin (city)
Templeogue Synge Street Gaelic footballers